The Pregnant Workers Fairness Act is a United States law meant to eliminate discrimination and ensure workplace accommodations for workers with known limitations related to pregnancy, childbirth, or a related medical condition. It applies to employers having fifteen or more employees. Originally a stand-alone bill first introduced in 2012, the bill was included as Division II of the Consolidated Appropriations Act, 2023, which was passed by Congress on December 27, 2022 and signed by President Joe Biden on December 29, 2022.

Background 
The Pregnant Workers Fairness Act was first introduced in the House of Representatives on May 8th, 2012 by Rep. Jerry Nadler (D-NY) following the publication of a January 2012 New York Times op-ed, “Pregnant, and Pushed Out of a Job.”

In 2014, the Senate Health, Education, Labor, and Pensions Committee held a hearing, “Economic Security for Working Women: A Roundtable Discussion,” in which several witnesses discussed the need for the Pregnant Workers Fairness Act. In 2019 the House of Representatives Education & Labor Committee held the first-ever dedicated hearing on the Pregnant Workers Fairness Act entitled “Long Over Due: Exploring the Pregnant Workers Fairness Act.” Witnesses included Congressman Jerry Nadler, Michelle Durham, an Alabama mother who was denied pregnancy accommodations, Iris Wilbur, then-Vice President of Greater Louisville Inc., Dina Bakst, Co-Founder & Co-President of A Better Balance, and Ellen McLaughlin, a partner at Seyfarth Shaw LLP. 

In September 2020, the bill passed the House of Representatives by a vote of 329-73. In March 2021, the House of Representatives Education & Labor Committee held a hearing entitled “Fighting for Fairness: Examining Legislation to Confront Workplace Discrimination,” with a focus on the Pregnant Workers Fairness Act, among other pieces of workplace legislation. In May 2021, the House of Representatives voted to pass the bill by a vote of 315-101. In August 2021, the Senate Health, Education, Labor, and Pensions Committee voted to pass the bill out of Committee by a vote of 19-2. 

The text of the bill was inserted by the Senate into the Consolidated Appropriations Act, 2023, which was passed by Congress on December 27, 2022.

Legislative history 
:

Provisions 
Specifically, the bill declares that it is an unlawful employment practice to:

 fail to make reasonable accommodations to known limitations of certain employees unless the accommodation would impose an undue hardship on an entity's business operation;
 require an employee affected by such limitations to accept an accommodation other than any reasonable accommodation arrived at through an interactive process;
 deny employment opportunities based on the need of the entity to make such reasonable accommodations to a qualified employee; 
 require such employees to take paid or unpaid leave if another reasonable accommodation can be provided; or 
 take adverse action in terms, conditions, or privileges of employment against a qualified employee requesting or using such reasonable accommodations.

See also 

 List of bills in the 116th United States Congress
 List of bills in the 117th United States Congress
 List of bills in the 115th United States Congress
 List of bills in the 114th United States Congress
 List of bills in the 113th United States Congress

References

External links 

Proposed legislation of the 112th United States Congress
Proposed legislation of the 113th United States Congress
Proposed legislation of the 114th United States Congress
Proposed legislation of the 115th United States Congress
Proposed legislation of the 116th United States Congress
Acts of the 117th United States Congress
United States federal postal legislation
United States federal civil rights legislation
Riders to United States federal appropriations legislation